Lori McNeil and Rennae Stubbs were the defending champions but only McNeil competed that year with Mercedes Paz.

McNeil and Paz lost in the first round to Marianne Werdel-Witmeyer and Tami Whitlinger-Jones.

Lindsay Davenport and Mary Joe Fernández won in the final 6–2, 6–3 against Sabine Appelmans and Miriam Oremans.

Seeds
Champion seeds are indicated in bold text while text in italics indicates the round in which those seeds were eliminated.

 Lindsay Davenport /  Mary Joe Fernández (champions)
 Nicole Bradtke /  Elna Reinach (quarterfinals)
 Lori McNeil /  Mercedes Paz (first round)
 Catherine Barclay /  Mariaan de Swardt (semifinals)

Draw

External links
 1995 Internationaux de Strasbourg Doubles Draw

1995
1995 WTA Tour
1995 in French sport